The Nikon F-601, otherwise known as the Nikon N6006, is a 35mm single-lens reflex (SLR) film camera that was produced by Nikon starting in 1991. The F601 featured an improved second-generation autofocus system, motor drive for automatic film advance, a built-in pop-up electronic flash, a top shutter speed of 1/2000 of a second, and a new "Matrix" evaluative multi-zone metering program.

The camera includes an integrated motor drive and is also available in a version with a date back, which could be set to print the date and time on the photo film as images were acquired. As a kit, the F601 shipped with a 35-to-70mm autofocus Nikkor zoom lens. It is compatible with a wide range of Nikon F-mount lenses, including both autofocus and manual focus types. However, Nikon's older, non-AI modified lens will not mount without modification. Doing so forcefully may damage the indexing pin on the body.

During the 1990s, the F-601 sat between the Nikon F-401 and Nikon F-801s in the company's consumer SLR range.

A version without autofocus or built-in flash was sold as the Nikon F-601M.

References

External links 

F601
F601
Products introduced in 1991